Jung Woo-seok (Hangul: 정우석; born January 31, 1998), more commonly known by the mononym Wooseok, is a South Korean rapper, songwriter, and composer. He debuted as a member of the South Korean boy group Pentagon in October 2016, and later formed a duo with Lai Kuan-lin as Wooseok X Kuanlin in March 2019. Wooseok co-writes a majority of Pentagon's output alongside the other members. He has also written music for other artists, including Wanna One and Ong Seong-wu. As of December 2022, the Korea Music Copyright Association has 95 songs listed under his name.

All credits are adapted from the Korea Music Copyright Association, unless stated otherwise.

Songs

2016

2017

2018

2019

2020

2021

2022

Others

Notes

References 

Wooseok
Wooseok
Songs